Oxygonium is a genus of ground beetles in the family Carabidae. There are at least two described species in Oxygonium.

Species
These two species belong to the genus Oxygonium:
 Oxygonium acutangulum Basilewsky, 1951  (Guinea)
 Oxygonium striatopunctatum Lecordier, 1966  (Sierra Leone)

References

Platyninae